Holovkivka may to the following places in Ukraine:

 Holovkivka, Chyhyryn Raion, village in Chyhyryn Raion, Cherkasy Oblast
 Holovkivka, Oleksandriia Raion, village in Oleksandriia Raion, Kirovohrad Oblast